is a 77-episode Japanese science fiction anime television series directed by Kazuyoshi Yokota and created by Nippon Animation and TV Asahi. It aired between January 10, 1986 and October 3, 1987. The series is based on comics created by Italian physicist Andrea Romoli. The series was a huge success in Japan and even won the Osamu Tezuka's Atom Award at the Tokyo Film Festival.

Story
The series depicts the adventures of four astronauts who travel through space and visit many planets. On each planet they have an adventure. Each adventure seems to have a moral, such as the value of friendship or the protection of endangered species.

Setting

The series takes place in a seemingly not so distant future. The world greatly resembles the world of the late 20th century, but there is a considerable amount of futuristic technology: interstellar travel is common place (the spatial agency which employs the characters is a modest  private agency  not related to the government), weapons which fire lasers exist, etc... But there isn't any mention of the Internet (the series was created before the internet became really common) and the characters use outdated technology such as floppy disks (instead of CDs or DVDs) to store data. At the beginning of the series the characters are mostly on Earth, but as the series progress the characters travel through space on board of their spaceship called "The Sagittarius". The characters visit many planets on which they have many adventures. Although the Sagittarius is an old spaceship which use a sort of oil as fuel, the spaceship is able to leave Earth and reach planets sometimes in as little time as a few hours. The characters do not require artificial respiratory systems and are able to breathe on each of the planets which they visit.

Themes

The show was full of humour but incorporated also very mature themes. Many episodes talked about subjects such as: friendship, war in general, danger of nuclear war or nuclear explosion (which is not surprising since Japan was the victim of the Hiroshima and Nagasaki bombings), protection of the environment and of endangered species, slavery (Sebeep was the personal singer of a taxidermist in one episode), alcoholism (there was an adventure in which Toppy had become an alcoholic and abandoned his family), pirates, virtual reality (in one adventure there was a complete world which was an illusion entirely controlled by a computer),etc.

Characters

Main characters
 
 
Toppy is the leader of the group. He is a young father with a wife and a baby daughter. He is usually the one who devises the strategy and tell the others what they should do. He is sometimes in conflict with Rana. In the beginning of the series he was a pilot employed by a spatial agency. The "Sagittarius", which is the spatial ship in which the heroes travel through space, comes from that agency.
 
 
He resembles an anthropomorphic green frog. He is married to an obese woman. He has seven children who love him dearly. When unemployed by the Sagittarius crew, he has difficulty to find a job he likes, often forced to work in bad conditions in factories, waiting for the next travel with the Sagittarius. He is the most aggressive of the group and has a short temper. He also likes to flirt with women. He adores lasagna. 
 
 
A giant yellow guy, he is the taller of the group. After Toppy he is the most wise member of the crew. He is a scientist and knows a lot about subjects such as chemistry, botany, among other things. He is completely in love with Professor Anne though there are not married during the most part of the show. Rana has a tendency to irritate him. Giraffe and Toppy are really the brains of the team and as such their role in the show is crucial. 
 
 
An anthropomorphic plant which resembles a cactus. Seebeep was found by Toppy, Rana and Giraffe on a planet in one of their adventures and he became a member of the team. Sebeep is always happy and smiling. He is always seen with a guitar attached on his back. He likes to sing and dance. Many times during the series he takes his guitar and sing a song. The episodes in which Sebeep is the star are very emotional episodes and almost always involve singing at some point.
 
 
A scientist, Professor Anne is the most regularly seen woman in the show. She has pink hair and her face resembles Toppy's a lot. She loves Giraffe, although she sometimes appear rude to him.

Other characters

Songs
Stardust Boys (	スターダスト ボーイズ) Opening theme
sung by:|Hironobu Kageyama}}&|Koorogi '73}}

Dream Light Years (夢光年）Ending theme
sung by:|Hironobu Kageyama}}&|Koorogi '73}}

Soul Brother (ソウルブラザー) Image Song
sung by:|Hironobu Kageyama}}&|Koorogi '73}}

LIVING IN THE LIFE Image Song
sung by:|Hironobu Kageyama}}&|Koorogi '73}}

References

External links 
 
 

1986 anime television series debuts
1986 Japanese television series debuts
1987 Japanese television series endings
Adventure anime and manga
Nippon Animation
Science fiction anime and manga
Television shows based on comics
Anime based on comics
TV Asahi original programming